Larry Glenn (born July 7, 1947) is a former Democratic member of the Oklahoma House of Representatives, representing the 7th District since 2005. He would have been term limited at the end of 2016, but chose not to seek reelection in 2014.

He served four years in the U.S. Air Force in southeast Asia and was honorably discharged as a staff sergeant in 1970.

He served four years as a Miami, Oklahoma police and fire commissioner, two years as a Miami finance commissioner, five years as an Ottawa County, Oklahoma undersheriff and serves on the National Conference of State Legislatures standing committee on environment.

He lives in Miami, with his wife, Janet Glenn. They have four children: Scott, Keith, Courtney and Benn and three grandchildren: Elise, Kyla and Conner.

Committee assignments
Glenn served on these legislative committees:
 A&B CareerTech
 A&B Non-appropriated
 Public Safety
 Conference Committee on States' Rights
 Conference Committee on Transportation
 States' Rights
 Transportation

References

External links
Oklahoma House of Representatives homepage
Oklahoma House of Representatives profile
Project Vote Smart profile
 Campaign Contributions:  Follow the Money

1947 births
Living people
Democratic Party members of the Oklahoma House of Representatives
People from Miami, Oklahoma
21st-century American politicians
Cherokee Nation state legislators in Oklahoma